The discography of Ben Harper consists of fifteen studio albums, five live albums, two digital albums, three concert films and three miscellaneous albums.

Albums

Studio albums

Live albums

Other albums

Virtual albums
 iTunes Originals – Ben Harper
 iTunes Must Haves – Ben Harper

EPs

Singles

Special appearances
Ben Harper appears in the (2002) documentary: Standing in the Shadows of Motown where he performs "Ain't Too Proud to Beg" and "I Heard It Through the Grapevine", both are live tracks recorded December 2000

Ben Harper appeared on John Mayer's The Village Sessions EP for the song "Waiting on the World to Change". The album was released on December 12, 2006.

Harper played a slide guitar version of the "Star-Spangled Banner" prior to Game 3 of the 2007 NBA Finals on June 12 in Cleveland. Harper performed alongside Ahmir "?uestlove" Thompson and John Paul Jones at the Bonnaroo Music Festival in 2007. He also appears on the 2003 Pearl Jam DVD Live at the Garden where Harper plays alongside friends Pearl Jam for the songs "Daughter" & "Indifference".

In 2008, Harper played the guitar in the single Fango, track of Safari, album of the Italian singer-songwriter Jovanotti. He and Jovanotti performed the song as guests of Sanremo Music Festival 2008, on February 29. Furthermore, that night Harper sung his song Lifeline.

Harper performed at several "Vote Obama" rallies and on the Willie Nelson show Outlaws & Angels. Harper teamed with the Skatalites to perform Fats Domino's "Be My Guest" on Goin' Home: A Tribute to Fats Domino. Harper was featured, alongside Jack Johnson, playing slide guitar with Toots and the Maytals, performing their 1970s reggae hit "Pressure Drop" on Saturday Night Live.

In January 2010, Harper and his band Relentless7 performed at the Grammy Museum with Ringo Starr in support of The Beatles drummer's self-produced album, Y Not. In early 2010, Harper also performed "Ohio" at the MusiCares tribute to Neil Young.

In July 2011, Harper performed as the headline musician at the Saturday in the Park music festival in Sioux City, IA.

In April 2013, Harper and Charlie Musselwhite were invited to perform in front of President Barack Obama and the First Lady as part of the "In Performance at the White House" series which honoured "Memphis Soul." They performed the track "I'm In, I'm Out and I'm Gone" from the album "Get Up!".

In 2021, Harper played the lap steel guitar on "If Ever", the lead single by Paula Fuga and Jack Johnson off Paula's album Rain on Sunday. This song charted #24 on the Adult Alternative Airplay chart.

Harper played acoustic guitar on "Boyfriends," the twelfth track of Harry Styles' third album, Harry's House.

Video albums

References

External links

 
 

Rock music discographies
Discographies of American artists